KBFK may refer to:

 Buffalo Municipal Airport (Oklahoma) (ICAO code KBFK)
 KBFK-LP, a low-power television station (channel 36) licensed to Bakersfield, California, United States